Churchwood is an avant-blues quintet from Austin, Texas known for its poetry-driven lyrics, high-energy performances, and eccentric approach to making blues-based rock and roll.
The lineup consists of Bill Anderson (guitar), Joe Doerr (vocals, harmonica), Adam Kahan (bass), Billysteve Korpi (guitar), and Eric Bohlke (drums).

Musical and lyrical style and influence 

Churchwood's musical influences are wide-ranging.  The band's self-proclaimed "dystopic blues" style belies its reverence for the likes of Howlin' Wolf, Muddy Waters, Bo Diddley, and other blues masters; however, many critics suggest that musical risk-takers like Captain Beefheart and the Magic Band, Tom Waits, and Nick Cave are of equal importance to Churchwood's sound.  Much like his published poetry, Doerr's lyrics reflect an interest in French Symbolism, Literary Modernism, Surrealism, and Beat Poetry.  His themes are largely existentialist in scope: absurdity, anxiety, alienation, passion, individuality, and authenticity are his primary concerns.

History 

Churchwood formed in 2007 in Austin, Texas and signed with Saustex Records in 2010.  Churchwood has released five records on the Saustex label: the eponymous LP Churchwood (2011), an EP Just the Two of Us (2012), the band's sophomore LP Churchwood 2 (2013), 3: Trickgnosis (2014), and most recently Hex City (2016).

In 2016, original drummer Julien Peterson left the band to pursue other interests; he was replaced by multi-instrumentalist Eric Bohlke of Austin's Khali Haat in the spring of 2017.

In 2011, Churchwood placed "Rimbaud Diddley" on Season 4, Episode 4 ("Una Venta") of AMC's "Sons of Anarchy."

Discography 

Churchwood—Churchwood (Saustex, 2011)
Churchwood—Just the Two of Us (Saustex, 2012)
Churchwood—Sample This: Saustex 2012 Sampler (Saustex, 2012)
Churchwood—2 (Saustex, 2013)
Churchwood—The Saustex Variations (Saustex, 2014)
Churchwood—3: Trickgnosis (Saustex 2014)
Churchwood—Hex City (Saustex 2016)
Churchwood—Plenty Wrong To Go Awry (Saustex 2020)
Churchwood-The Boule Oui (Saustex 2022)

References

External links 

Churchwood at All Music
Churchwood at Saustex Media
Churchwood at Reverb Nation
Churchwood "I Have a Devil in Me"
Churchwood "Duende (Live at The Hole in the Wall)"

American experimental rock groups
Musical groups established in 2007